Miguel Angel Nava (born July 29, 1969) is a Mexican Luchador, or professional wrestler best known under the ring name, Mike Segura. North American fans knows Nava under the name Super Nova from his appearances in the World Wrestling Federation (WWF). Nava originally worked in Consejo Mundial de Lucha Libre's (CMLL) Minis division and held the CMLL World Mini-Estrella Championship but later moved into the regular division. Nava currently works for International Wrestling Revolution Group (IWRG) as Mike Segura.

Professional wrestling career

Consejo Mundial de Lucha Libre
Miguel Angel Nava made his professional wrestling debut in 1991; in 1992 then-CMLL booker Antonio Peña left Consejo Mundial de Lucha Libre (CMLL) to form his own promotion, Asistencia Asesoría y Administración (AAA); Peña had been the mastermind behind the CMLL Minis division and most of the Minis in CMLL decided to leave with Peña. Serrano and a number of other wrestlers were brought in to replenish the division. Working in the Mini division does not necessarily mean that Nava is a dwarf as several short wrestlers work in the "Mini" division. Miguel Nava was one of the wrestlers brought into CMLL to replenish the division, he was given the ring persona of Orito, a mini version of Oro who worked in CMLL at the time. On September 6, 1992 Orito won a tournament to crown a new CMLL World Mini-Estrella Champion after the AAA exodus, defeating El Felinito in the final. On March 14, 1993, lost the CMLL Minis title to Último Dragóncito, ending his reign at 189 days. In the mid to late-1990s CMLL did not focus much on their Minis division, their rarely made it onto their television shows which meant that Orito only used sparingly for a number of years. During the slow period Orito began a long running storyline, or feud, with El Felinito, a feud that the two of them would continue after jumping to AAA in 1997.

Asistencia Asesoría y Administración
In AAA Nava was given a new ring persona, "Super Nova", was moved into the "regular" divisions and made a part of the wrestling group Los Cadetes Del Espacio (Spanish for "The Space Cadets"). El Felinito was also moved into the "regular" division, repackaged as "Mach-1" and made a part of a group called Los Rudos De La Galaxia (The Villains of the Galaxy). Miguel Nava, as Super Nova, made several appearances for the World Wrestling Federation (WWF) as part of the AAA/WWF talent trading agreement. His first appearance was on the March 24, 1997 WWF Monday Night Raw where he teamed up with fellow "Cadets" Discovery and Venum to defeat the "Rudos De La Galaxia" team of Abismo Negro, El Mosco and Histeria. The following day, at a WWF Shotgun Saturday Night taping Super Nova, Discovery, Venum and Ludxor defeated the team of Abismo Negro, El Mosco, Histeria and Maniaco. Super Nova's last WWF match was on March 31, 1997 when he lost a singles match to El Mosco on Monday Night Raw. while Miguel Nava did not make further WWF appearances a mini version of Super Nova, called Mino Nova or just Nova wrestled for the WWF from 1997 until 1999.

International Wrestling Revolution Group
In the fall of 1997 Miguel Nava, along with a large group of other wrestlers, left AAA and ended up working for rival promotion Promo Azteca. Nava used the ring character "Oro, Jr.", the same mask and tights as Orito but this time he competed in the regular division. During his debut for Promo Azteca he wore the "Super Nova" mask, but removed it to reveal the Oro, Jr. mask. After Promo Azteca folded Nava began working for a promotion out of Arena Neza, when that promotion became International Wrestling Revolution Group (IWRG) Nava was one of the regulars. In 1998 Nava lost the "Oro, Jr." mask after losing a Luchas de Apuestas match to Dr. Cerebro. After being unmasked he started work as "Mike Segura" and quickly earned the nickname "Suicida" due to his high risk dives out of the ring. On February 15, 2007 Segura teamed up with Dr. Cerebro and Cerebro Negro to win the IWRG Intercontinental Trios Championship from El Hijo del Diablo, Fantasma de la Opera and Veneno. The trio would defend the championship for 154 days before losing to the Escuadron de la Muerte team of Capitan Muerte, Cyborg Cop and Xibalba Shortly after the title loss Mike Segura disappeared from the IWRG, soon after an enmascarado called "Aeroman" made his debut with a style so close to Segura's that it was impossible to hide his true identity causing fans to chant "Suicida" during his matches. He briefly left IWRG to work for Desastre Total Ultraviolento (DTU) as Mike Segura, in DTU he won the DTU Extreme Championship from Aero Boy on February 2, 2008, holding it for 72 days before losing it to Paranoiko. In May 2009 an unmasked Mike Segura returned to IWRG with no mention of the Aeroman gimmick. On July 5, 2009 Mike Segura lost a Prison Fatal match to Avisman I and as a result had his hair shaved.

Personal life
Nava's brother is a retired professional wrestler, he used to work as "Pantera I", teaming with Pantera II.

Championships and accomplishments
Consejo Mundial de Lucha Libre
CMLL World Mini-Estrella Championship (1 time)
Comision de Box y Lucha D.F.
Mexico State Welterweight Championship (1 time)
Desastre Total Ultraviolento
DTU Extreme Championship (1 time)
International Wrestling League
IWL International Junior Heavyweight Championship (1 time)
International Wrestling Revolution Group
IWRG Intercontinental Trios Championship (1 time) – with Dr. Cerebro and Cerebro Negro
Copa Higher Power (1998) – with Mr. Niebla, El Pantera, Shocker, El Solar and Star Boy

Luchas de Apuestas record

Notes

References

1969 births
Living people
Mexican male professional wrestlers
Mini-Estrella wrestlers
Professional wrestlers from the State of Mexico
20th-century professional wrestlers
21st-century professional wrestlers
CMLL World Mini-Estrella Champions